Mesalina olivieri, also known commonly as Olivier's sand lizard, is a species of sand-dwelling lizard in the family Lacertidae. The species is endemic to North Africa and the Middle East.

Etymology
The specific name, olivieri, is in honor of French entomologist Guillaume-Antoine Olivier.

Geographic range
M. olivieri occurs in Algeria, Egypt, Iraq, Israel, Jordan, Libya, Morocco, Saudi Arabia, Tunisia, and Western Sahara.

Habitat

Reproduction
M. olivieri is oviparous.

References

Further reading
Audouin, "Victor [sic]" (1829). "Explication sommaire des Planches de Reptiles (supplément), Publiées par Jules-César Savigny, Membre de l'Institut; offrant un exposé des caractères naturels des genres avec la distinction des espèces ". pp. 97-140. In: [Commission des sciences et arts de l'Égypte ] (1829). Description de l'Égypte, ou Recueil des observations et des recherches qui ont été faites en Égypt pendant l'expédition de l'armée française. Second édition dédiée au Roi. Tome vingt-quatrieme [Volume 24] Histoire naturelle, Zoologie.  Paris: C.L.F. Panckoucke. 579 pp. (Lacerta olivieri, new species, pp. 122-125). (in French).
Sindaco, Roberto; Jeremčenko, Valery K. (2008). The Reptiles of the Western Palearctic: 1. Annotated Checklist and Distributional Atlas of the Turtles, Crocodiles, Amphisbaenians and Lizards of Europe, North Africa, Middle East and Central Asia. Latina, Italy: Edizioni Belvedere. 580 pp. .
Trape, Jean-François; Trape, Sébastien; Chirio, Laurent (2012). Lézards, crocodiles et tortues d'Afrique occidentale et du Sahara. Paris: IRD Orstom. 503 pp. . (in French).

olivieri
Reptiles described in 1829
Taxa named by Jean Victoire Audouin